Badamu may refer to:
 Badamu, Fars (بادامو - Bādāmū)